mSv or MSV may refer to:

 Maize streak virus, a plant disease
 Medium-speed vehicle, US category
 Medium Systems Vehicle, a class of fictional artificially intelligent starship in The Culture universe of late Scottish author Iain Banks
 Millisievert, radiation unit
 Mississippi and Skuna Valley Railroad, 1925–2008, reporting mark
Mixed single vote, a type of electoral system
 Mobile Satellite Ventures, US company
 Modular Scalable Vest, a US military body armor vest
 MotorSport Vision, a UK  organisation
 M. S. Viswanathan (1928–2015), Indian composer
 Motor Stand-by Vessel, a merchant vessel name prefix

See also